This page details tournament performances pertaining to Tiger Woods.

For a list of his career achievements see List of career achievements by Tiger Woods. All tournaments are PGA Tour tournaments unless otherwise stated.

1992

Tournaments

Summary

Notes
Participated in his first PGA Tour event at the Nissan Los Angeles Open. Woods did not make the cut, which was at 1 under-par. He played on February 27 and February 28, and was 16 years and 59 days old when he first played on the PGA Tour.

1993

Tournaments

Summary

1994

Tournaments

Summary

Notes

Shot his first under-par round in a PGA Tour event at the Buick Classic. Woods shot a 70 (−1).

1995

Tournaments

Summary

Notes

Made his first cut in a PGA Tour event at The Masters. Woods was the highest finishing amateur at the event. He was also the highest finishing amateur at the Motorola Western Open.

1996

Tournaments

Summary

Notes
Woods debuted as a professional at the Greater Milwaukee Open on September 1, 1996. He did not earn money before then due to his amateur status.
Highest finishing amateur at The Open Championship. This was also the last event Woods played in as an amateur. 
Turned professional in August 1996. In his first event as a professional, Woods finished tied for 60th at the Greater Milwaukee Open.
Won his first title on the PGA Tour at the Las Vegas Invitational which was a five-round event. Woods won the Walt Disney World/Oldsmobile Classic two weeks later which is the first four-round event that he won.

1997

Tournaments

Summary

Notes
Won his first major at the 1997 Masters. He won at the age of 21 years and 104 days old making him the youngest Masters winner ever. He also set the scoring record in the Masters by shooting a 270 (−18).

1998

Tournaments

Summary

1999

Tournaments

Summary

2000

Tournaments

Summary

2001

Tournaments

Summary

2002

Tournaments

Summary

2003

Tournaments

Summary

2004

Tournaments

Summary

2005

Tournaments

Summary

2006

Tournaments

Summary

2007

Tournaments

Summary

2008

Tournaments

Summary

2009

Tournaments

Summary

2010

Tournaments

Summary

*Because Woods withdrew from The Players Championship after having made the cut, it counts as a cut made.

2011

Tournaments

Summary

2012

Tournaments

Summary

2013

Tournaments

Summary

2013−14

Tournaments

*Because Woods withdrew from The Honda Classic after having made the cut, it counts as a cut made.

Summary

2014−15

Tournaments

Summary

2015−16
Woods missed the entire season recovering from surgery.

Summary

2016−17

Tournaments

Summary

2017−18

Tournaments

Summary

2018−19

Tournaments

Summary

2019−20

Tournaments

JCo-sanctioned by the Japan Golf Tour

Summary

2020−21

Tournaments

Summary

2021−22

Tournaments

Summary

2022−23

Tournaments

Summary

Other PGA Tour

Performance at the WGC-Match Play
The WGC-Match Play is one of the annual World Golf Championships.

Note: Switched to three rounds of group play followed by 16 player knockout in 2015.

Performance at the PGA Grand Slam of Golf
The PGA Grand Slam of Golf was the world's most exclusive golf tournament. It was an annual off-season golf tournament contested by the year's winners of the four major championships of regular men's golf, which are the Masters Tournament, the U.S. Open, The Open Championship (British Open), and the PGA Championship.

The event was match play in 1998 and 1999. It was stroke play in all other years. Woods won in seven consecutive appearances.

Performance at the World Challenge
The World Challenge is an off-season tournament which is hosted by Woods. It is played in December.

European Tour
Woods first tournament win as a professional on the European Tour was at the Johnnie Walker Classic in 1998. He did not earn any money before that due to his amateur status. World Golf Championships and major events (all British Opens and U.S.-based majors since 1998) are also considered European Tour events but they are covered in the PGA Tour section.

Woods is not a European Tour member and therefore does not qualify to count his winnings towards the career money list. He is third on the all-time wins list.

Tournaments

AsCo-sanctioned by the Asian Tour
AuCo-sanctioned by the PGA Tour of Australasia
SCo-sanctioned by the Sunshine Tour

Summary

Note: Woods' 1997 Masters win is included here but not the money earned.
*Those tournaments listed above.
^Those majors and WGCs that are also official PGA Tour events.

Japan Golf Tour
Woods has participated in six events on the Japan Golf Tour. He has played in the Casio World Open once, the Dunlop Phoenix Tournament four times, and the Zozo Championship once (an event co-sanctioned by the PGA Tour).

Tournaments

PCo-sanctioned by the PGA Tour

Summary

Source

Asian Tour

ECo-sanctioned by the European Tour
SCo-sanctioned by the Sunshine Tour
ACo-sanctioned by the PGA Tour of Australasia

Summary

PGA Tour of Australasia

ECo-sanctioned by the European Tour
ACo-sanctioned by the Asian Tour
SCo-sanctioned by the Sunshine Tour

Summary

Unofficial money events earning OWGR points
All tournaments listed above were official money events on one or more tours (unless noted) and earned Official World Golf Ranking (OWGR) points except the 1997 Asian Honda Classic, which did not carry OWGR points. Woods competed in other events that were tour-sanctioned, earned unofficial money, and earned OWGR points. These were:
1998 Cisco World Match Play Championship (2nd place, US$150,000)
1998 Million Dollar Challenge (2nd place, US$250,000)
All World Challenge events beginning in 2010

Team events

Ryder Cup
All records are in win–loss–tie format.

Presidents Cup
All records are in win–loss–tie format.

Notes and references
All information is from golfstats.com and pgatour.com.

Woods, Tiger
Tiger Woods